Volleyball competitions at the 2019 Pacific Games were held in Apia, Samoa during July 2019. Both indoor volleyball and beach volleyball were played.

Medal summary

Medal table

Results

Volleyball
Indoor volleyball was played at the National University of Samoa.

Men's tournament
Eleven men's teams participated in 2019:

Women's tournament
Seven women's teams participated in 2019:

Beach volleyball
The beach volleyball competition was played the Apia Waterfront.

Men
Sixteen men's beach volleyball teams participated in 2019:

Women
Eleven women's beach volleyball teams participated in 2019:

See also
 Beach volleyball at the Pacific Games
 Volleyball at the Pacific Games

References

 
2019 Pacific Games
Pacific Games
2019